The Bailiwick of Guernsey includes the island of Guernsey and other islands such as Alderney, Sark, Herm, Jethou, Brecqhou, and Lihou. Each parish was established, probably in the 11th century, as a religious area, each having its parish church. Administratively each parish is now administered by an elected council known as a Douzaine.

Parishes
The island of Guernsey is divided into ten parishes. The Bailiwick of Guernsey also includes the parish of Saint Anne, Alderney and the parish of Saint Peter, Sark, but these are not generally included in the enumeration of parishes as the names are not of administrative significance:

n Non-administrative parishes

Herm and Jethou form part of the parish of St Peter Port. Lihou falls within the area of St Pierre du Bois.

History
The population of and names of the parish are recorded in The History of the Island of Guernsey in 1814.

Administration

Each parish is administered by a Douzaine. Douzeniers are elected for a four-year mandate, for most parishes three Douzeniers being elected by parishioners at a parish meeting in November each year (total 12). The Vale elects four each year (total 16) and St Peter Port five (total 20). The senior Douzenier is known as the Doyen (Dean). To stand for election the candidate must reside in the Parish.

One or more Douzaine representatives represent their parish at the States of Election when a new Jurat is elected.

Two elected Constables carry out the decisions of the Douzaine, serving for between one and three years. The longer-serving Constable is known as the Senior Constable and his or her colleague as the Junior Constable. Historically the Constables have been in existence since at least 1481 although their duties have been reduced over the centuries.

Both Douzeniers and Constables can be removed by the Royal Court for failing in their duty.

Parish business 
Amongst the many varied duties: 
 Obligation to ensure roadside hedges are trimmed
 Supervise watercourses (douits)
 Administer Parish cemeteries
 Maintain wayside pumps and troughs
 Collecting Parish rates 
 Issue dog licence and collect dog tax
 Manage parish boat moorings
Parishes officials also advise the States of Guernsey on matters pertaining to the Parish, such as licensing drinking, entertainment and betting establishments.

Nicknames
Inhabitants of each of the parishes of Guernsey also have traditional nicknames, although these have generally dropped out of use among the English-speaking population. The traditional nicknames are:

See also
Parishes of Jersey

References